The 2010 Tipperary Senior Hurling Championship was the 120th staging of the Tipperary Senior Hurling Championship since its establishment by the Tipperary County Board in 1887. The championship began on 18 September 2010 and ended on 31 October 2010.

Thurles Sarsfields were the defending champions.

On 31 October 2010, Thurles Sarsfields won the championship after a 1-16 to 1-07 defeat of Clonoulty-Rossmore in the final at Semple Stadium. It was their 31st championship title overall and their second title in succession.

External links

 The County Senior Hurling Championship 2010

References

Tipperary Senior Hurling Championship
Tipperary